TacSat-6 is a U.S. military experimental technology and communication satellites. The Operationally Responsive Space Office (ORS) funded the launch that will be performed by the United States Army Space and Missile Defense Command (SMDC).

The spacecraft was launched on 6 December 2013, at 07:14:30 UTC, on a Atlas V 501 launch vehicle from Vandenberg Air Force Base, SLC-3E.

Mission 
TacSat-6 is equipped that can be used for any combination of communications. Part of its capability is rapid (within 24 hours) reallocation to different theaters worldwide, in support of unexpected operations. Command and control of TacSat-6 is performed by the United States Army Space and Missile Defense Command (SMDC).

Design 
All TacSat satellites are designed to demonstrate the ability to provide real-time data collected from space to combatant commanders in the field.

The spacecraft bus was built by United States Army Space and Missile Defense Command (SMDC).

References 

Spacecraft launched in 2011